Rowland Thomas Baring, 2nd Earl of Cromer,  (29 November 1877 – 13 May 1953), styled Viscount Errington between 1901 and 1917, was a British diplomat and courtier.

Career

Baring was a member of the Baring family and the son of Evelyn Baring, 1st Earl of Cromer.

He was appointed to the Diplomatic Service as a Third Secretary in July 1902.

During the First World War he served as a subaltern in the Grenadier Guards.
From 1922 to 1938 he was Lord Chamberlain of the Household.

Family
Lord Cromer married Lady Ruby Elliot-Murray-Kynynmound, daughter of Gilbert Elliot-Murray-Kynynmound, 4th Earl of Minto, on 4 April 1908. They had three children:

Lady Rosemary Ethel Baring (1908–2004), married Lt.-Col. J.D. Hills and had issue.
Lady Violet Mary Baring (b. 17 December 1911), married Major Mervyn Vernon.
George Rowland Stanley Baring, 3rd Earl of Cromer (1918–1991)

Media depictions 
In the 2005 film Mrs Henderson Presents, Cromer is portrayed by actor Christopher Guest.  In the Downton Abbey 2013 Christmas Special, he is portrayed by the series' historical consultant, Alastair Bruce.

References

External links

1877 births
1953 deaths
Earls in the Peerage of the United Kingdom
Knights Grand Commander of the Order of the Indian Empire
Knights Grand Cross of the Order of the Bath
Knights Grand Cross of the Royal Victorian Order
Bailiffs Grand Cross of the Order of St John
Members of the Privy Council of the United Kingdom
Permanent Lords-in-Waiting
Grenadier Guards officers
British Army personnel of World War I
Assistant Private Secretaries to the Sovereign
Rowland
Presidents of the Marylebone Cricket Club